This is a history of the lithium-ion battery.

Prior work 

Much of the basic research that led to the development of the intercalation compounds that form the core of lithium-ion batteries was carried out in the 1960s by Robert Huggins and Carl Wagner, who studied the movement of ions in solids. Reversible intercalation of lithium ions into graphite as anodes and intercalation of lithium ions into cathodic oxide as cathodes was discovered during 1974–76 by Jürgen Otto Besenhard at TU Munich. Besenhard proposed its application in lithium cells. What was missing in Besenhard's batteries is an electrolyte, that would prevent solvent co-intercalation into graphite, electrolyte decomposition and corrosion of current collectors. Thus, his batteries had very short cycle lives.   

British chemist M. Stanley Whittingham, then a researcher at ExxonMobil, first reported a charge-discharge cycling with a lithium metal battery (a precursor to modern lithium-ion batteries) in the 1970s. However, this setup proved impractical. Titanium disulfide was expensive  (~$1,000 per kilogram in the 1970s) and difficult to work with, since it has to be synthesized under completely oxygen and moisture-free conditions. When exposed to air, it reacts to form hydrogen sulfide compounds, which have an unpleasant odour and are toxic to humans and most animals. For this, and other reasons, Exxon discontinued development of Whittingham's lithium-titanium disulfide battery.

Batteries with metallic lithium electrodes presented safety issues, as lithium metal reacts with water, releasing flammable hydrogen gas. Consequently, research moved to develop batteries in which, instead of metallic lithium, only lithium compounds are present, being capable of accepting and releasing lithium ions.

Development 

 1973: Adam Heller proposed the lithium thionyl chloride battery, still used in implanted medical devices and in defense systems where a greater than 20-year shelf life, high energy density, and/or tolerance for extreme operating temperatures are required.
 1977: Samar Basu et al demonstrated irreversible intercalation of lithium in graphite at the University of Pennsylvania. This led to the development of a workable lithium intercalated graphite electrode at Bell Labs in 1984 to provide an alternative to the lithium metal electrode battery. However it was only a molten salt cell battery rather than a lithium ion battery.
 1979: Working in separate groups, Ned A. Godshall et al., and, shortly thereafter, John B. Goodenough (Oxford University) and Koichi Mizushima (Tokyo University), demonstrated limited discharge-charge cycling of a 4 V cell made with lithium cobalt dioxide as the positive electrode and lithium metal as the negative electrode. This innovation provided the positive electrode material that enabled early commercial lithium batteries.  is a stable positive electrode material which acts as a donor of lithium ions, which means that it can be used with a negative electrode material other than lithium metal. By enabling the use of stable and easy-to-handle negative electrode materials,  enabled novel rechargeable battery systems. Godshall et al. further identified the similar value of ternary compound lithium-transition metal-oxides such as the spinel LiMn2O4, Li2MnO3, LiMnO2, LiFeO2, LiFe5O8, and LiFe5O4 (and later lithium-copper-oxide and lithium-nickel-oxide cathode materials in 1985)
 1980: Rachid Yazami demonstrated the reversible electrochemical intercalation of lithium in graphite, and invented the lithium graphite electrode (anode). The organic electrolytes available at the time would decompose during charging with a graphite negative electrode. Yazami used a solid electrolyte to demonstrate that lithium could be reversibly intercalated in graphite through an electrochemical mechanism. As of 2011, Yazami's graphite electrode was the most commonly used electrode in commercial lithium-ion batteries.
The negative electrode has its origins in PAS (polyacenic semiconductive material) discovered by Tokio Yamabe and later by Shjzukuni Yata in the early 1980s. The seed of this technology was the discovery of conductive polymers by Professor Hideki Shirakawa and his group, and it could also be seen as having started from the polyacetylene lithium ion battery developed by Alan MacDiarmid and Alan J. Heeger et al.
 1982: Godshall et al. were awarded  for the use of LiCoO2 as cathodes in lithium batteries, based on Godshall's Stanford University Ph.D. dissertation and 1979 publications.
 1983: Michael M. Thackeray, Peter Bruce, William David, and John B. Goodenough developed manganese spinel, Mn2O4, as a charged cathode material for lithium-ion batteries. It has two flat plateaus on discharge with lithium one at 4V, stoichiometry LiMn2O4, and one at 3V with a final stoichiometry of Li2Mn2O4. 
 1985: Akira Yoshino assembled a prototype cell using carbonaceous material into which lithium ions could be inserted as one electrode, and lithium cobalt oxide as the other. This dramatically improved safety.  enabled industrial-scale production and enabled the commercial lithium-ion battery.
 1989: Arumugam Manthiram and John B. Goodenough discovered the polyanion class of cathodes. They showed that positive electrodes containing polyanions, e.g., sulfates, produce higher voltages than oxides due to the inductive effect of the polyanion. This polyanion class contains materials such as lithium iron phosphate.
 1990: Jeff Dahn and two colleagues at Dalhousie University reported reversible intercalation of lithium ions into graphite in the presence of ethylene carbonate solvent, thus finding the final piece of the puzzle leading to the modern lithium-ion battery.

Commercialization and advances 

The performance and capacity of lithium-ion batteries increased as development progressed.

 1991: Sony and Asahi Kasei released the first commercial lithium-ion battery. The Japanese team that successfully commercialized the technology was led by Yoshio Nishi.
 1996: Goodenough, Akshaya Padhi and coworkers proposed lithium iron phosphate and other phospho-olivines (lithium metal phosphates with the same structure as mineral olivine) as positive electrode materials.
 1998: C. S. Johnson, J. T. Vaughey, M. M. Thackeray, T. E. Bofinger, and S. A. Hackney report the discovery of the high capacity high voltage lithium-rich NMC cathode materials.
 2001: Arumugam Manthiram and co-workers discovered that the capacity limitations of layered oxide cathodes is a result of chemical instability that can be understood based on the relative positions of the metal 3d band relative to the top of the oxygen 2p band. This discovery has had significant implications for the practically accessible compositional space of lithium ion battery layered oxide cathodes, as well as their stability from a safety perspective.
 2001: Christopher Johnson, Michael Thackeray, Khalil Amine, and Jaekook Kim file a patent for lithium nickel manganese cobalt oxide (NMC) lithium rich cathodes based on a domain structure.
 2001: Zhonghua Lu and Jeff Dahn file a patent for the NMC class of positive electrode materials, which offers safety and energy density improvements over the widely used lithium cobalt oxide.
 2002: Yet-Ming Chiang and his group at MIT showed a substantial improvement in the performance of lithium batteries by boosting the material's conductivity by doping it with aluminium, niobium and zirconium. The exact mechanism causing the increase became the subject of widespread debate.
 2004: Yet-Ming Chiang again increased performance by utilizing lithium iron phosphate particles of less than 100 nanometers in diameter. This decreased particle density almost one hundredfold, increased the positive electrode's surface area and improved capacity and performance. Commercialization led to a rapid growth in the market for higher capacity lithium-ion batteries, as well as a patent infringement battle between Chiang and John Goodenough.
2005: Y Song, PY Zavalij, and M. Stanley Whittingham report a new two-electron vanadium phosphate cathode material with high energy density
 2011: Lithium nickel manganese cobalt oxide (NMC) cathodes, developed at Argonne National Laboratory, are manufactured commercially by BASF in Ohio.
 2011: Lithium-ion batteries accounted for 66% of all portable secondary (i.e., rechargeable) battery sales in Japan.
 2012: John Goodenough, Rachid Yazami and Akira Yoshino received the 2012 IEEE Medal for Environmental and Safety Technologies for developing the lithium ion battery.
 2014: John Goodenough, Yoshio Nishi, Rachid Yazami and Akira Yoshino were awarded the Charles Stark Draper Prize of the National Academy of Engineering for their pioneering efforts in the field.
 2014: Commercial batteries from Amprius Corp. reached 650 Wh/L (a 20% increase), using a silicon anode and were delivered to customers.
 2016: Koichi Mizushima and Akira Yoshino received the NIMS Award from the National Institute for Materials Science, for Mizushima's discovery of the LiCoO2 cathode material for the lithium-ion battery and Yoshino's development of the lithium-ion battery.
 2016: Z. Qi, and Gary Koenig reported a scalable method to produce sub-micrometer sized  using a template-based approach.
 2019: The Nobel Prize in Chemistry was given to John Goodenough, Stanley Whittingham and Akira Yoshino "for the development of lithium ion batteries".
 2022: Battery startup SPARKZ announced plans to convert a glass plant in Bridgeport, WV to produce zero-cobalt lithium batteries.

Market 

Industry produced about 660 million cylindrical lithium-ion cells in 2012; the 18650 size is by far the most popular for cylindrical cells. If Tesla were to have met its goal of shipping 40,000 Model S electric cars in 2014 and if the 85-kWh battery, which uses 7,104 of these cells, had proved as popular overseas as it was in the United States, a 2014 study projected that the Model S alone would use almost 40 percent of estimated global cylindrical battery production during 2014. , production was gradually shifting to higher-capacity 3,000+ mAh cells. Annual flat polymer cell demand was expected to exceed 700 million in 2013.

Prices of lithium-ion batteries have fallen over time. Overall, between 1991 and 2018, prices for all types of lithium-ion cells (in dollars per kWh) fell approximately 97%. Over the same time period, energy density more than tripled. Efforts to increase energy density contributed significantly to cost reduction. 

In 2015, cost estimates ranged from $300–500/kWh. In 2016 GM revealed they would be paying  for the batteries in the Chevy Bolt EV. In 2017, the average residential energy storage systems installation cost was expected to drop from $1600 /kWh in 2015 to $250 /kWh by 2040 and to see the price with 70% reduction by 2030. In 2019, some electric vehicle battery pack costs were estimated at $150–200, and VW noted it was paying  for its next generation of electric vehicles.

Batteries are used for grid energy storage and ancillary services. For a Li-ion storage coupled with photovoltaics and an anaerobic digestion biogas power plant, Li-ion will generate a higher profit if it is cycled more frequently (hence a higher lifetime electricity output) although the lifetime is reduced due to degradation.

Lithium nickel manganese cobalt oxide (NMC) cells come in several commercial types, specified by the ratio of component metals. NMC 111 (or NMC 333) have equal parts of nickel, manganese and cobalt, whereas NMC 532 has 5 parts nickel, 3 parts manganese and 2 parts cobalt. , NMC 532 and NMC 622 were the preferred low-cobalt types for electric vehicles, with NMC 811 and even lower cobalt ratios seeing increasing use, mitigating cobalt dependency. However, cobalt for electric vehicles increased 81% from the first half of 2018 to 7,200 tonnes in the first half of 2019, for a battery capacity of 46.3 GWh.

In 2010, global lithium-ion battery production capacity was 20 gigawatt-hours. 
By 2016, it was 28 GWh, with 16.4 GWh in China. Production in 2021 is estimated by various sources to be between 200 and 600 GWh, and predictions for 2023 range from 400 to 1,100 GWh.

An antitrust-violating price-fixing cartel among nine corporate families, including LG Chem, GS Yuasa, Hitachi Maxell, NEC, Panasonic/Sanyo, Samsung, Sony, and Toshiba was found to be rigging battery prices and restricting output between 2000 and 2011.

References 

Lithium-ion batteries
History of technology
History of electrical engineering